Santeri Haarala (born 17 December 1999) is a Finnish professional footballer who plays as a  winger for KuPS in the Veikkausliiga.

Career
On 7 August 2019, Haarala left Ilves to join Rovaniemen Palloseura on a contract for the rest of 2019. He didn't get his contract extended and left the club at the end of the year.

After a short spell with the reserve team of his former club FC Ilves, Haarala joined TPS in August 2020 on a deal for the rest of the year.

References

External links

1999 births
Living people
Finnish footballers
FC Ilves players
Rovaniemen Palloseura players
Turun Palloseura footballers
Veikkausliiga players
Kakkonen players
Association football wingers
Kuopion Palloseura players
Footballers from Tampere